Moon So-ri (born July 2, 1974) is a South Korean actress, film director and screenwriter. She is best known for her acclaimed leading roles in Oasis (2002) and A Good Lawyer's Wife (2003).

Career 
After graduating with a degree in Education from Sungkyunkwan University, Moon So-ri became part of the theater group Hangang ("Han River") from 1995 to 1997, and debuted in the play Classroom Idea (she also collaborated in its creation). She appeared in plays and short films such as Black Cut and To the Spring Mountain before finding fame as a leading actress. Her first film role was in Lee Chang-dong's acclaimed Peppermint Candy, however her acting skills were not really showcased until she appeared in her second film Oasis, also by Lee Chang-dong. Her powerful portrayal of a woman with cerebral palsy earned her strong praise as well as the Marcello Mastroianni Award for Emerging Actor or Actress at the 2002 Venice Film Festival (Moon is only the second Korean to win a prize there, after Kang Soo-yeon in 1985 for The Surrogate Woman). She was also named Best Actress at the 2003 Seattle International Film Festival.

The following year she again found fame in Im Sang-soo's third film A Good Lawyer's Wife. A 180-degree turn from her previous screen image, this film featured her as a free thinking woman in a decaying marriage who starts an affair with the teenage boy next door. This film was also invited to the Venice Film Festival, and she later won the Best Actress award from the Stockholm International Film Festival. Similar to the case with Oasis, Best Actress honors at many domestic awards ceremonies followed.

Moon starred opposite Song Kang-ho in 2004's The President's Barber, a film that illustrates 20 years of modern Korean history through the eyes of president Park Chung-hee's personal barber. She took a more central role in her next feature Sa-kwa, an introspective relationship drama about a woman who embarks on a new relationship after being dumped by her long-time boyfriend. Also from 2005, Bravo, My Life! saw her return to the historical era of the late 70s/early 80s in a family drama set against the political upheaval of those times.

In 2006, she played a sexually promiscuous professor in Bewitching Attraction, then a disapproving sister in Family Ties (for which she shared Best Actress honors with three castmates at the 2006 Thessaloniki Film Festival, where their film also swept Best Picture and Best Screenplay). Moon starred in her first ever television series in 2007, the big-budget fusion fantasy-period drama The Legend. She then narrated My Heart Is Not Broken Yet, a documentary on Song Sin-do and her decade-long lawsuit against the Japanese government for an official apology towards her fellow comfort women.

She followed that with sports movie Forever the Moment (a sleeper hit in 2008), another TV drama (about a family of grown-up siblings), and the human rights-themed Fly, Penguin in 2009.

To promote the 2009 Green Film Festival in Seoul, Kim Tae-yong directed Moon in the short film Take Action, Now or Never! about power saving, cycling, and handkerchief use (her husband Jang Joon-hwan appeared in a cameo). She was also one of the four characters in Baik Hyun-jhin's short film The End.

After appearing in A Little Pond, the 2010 dramatization of the No Gun Ri Massacre, Moon joined the ensemble cast of Hong Sang-soo's Ha Ha Ha. Ha Ha Ha won the top prize in the Un Certain Regard section of the 2010 Cannes Film Festival.

Having always expressed a desire to return to her stage roots, Moon did so in 2006 in Sulpun Yonguk ("Sad Play") and again in the 2010 Korean production of The Pitmen Painters.

Her voice acting for Leafie, A Hen into the Wild was praised as "superb [...] instantly recognizable and articulating the gumption and touching naivete of the eponymous hen with great conviction," and in 2011 Leafie became the most successful Korean animated film of the modern era, with over 2 million admissions. That same year, Moon joined Konkuk University's Faculty of Arts as a professor of film studies.

In 2012, she worked again with Hong Sang-soo in In Another Country, which was headlined by French actress Isabelle Huppert, of whom Moon is a fan.

Because she found his script "unique and creative," Moon took a risk on newbie director Park Myung-rang and joined the cast of his 2013 crime thriller An Ethics Lesson. She then reunited with Sol Kyung-gu in the spy comedy The Spy: Undercover Operation.

In 2014, Moon starred in Venus Talk, about the romantic and sex lives of three women in their forties. She also appeared in Park Chan-kyong's fantasy/documentary Manshin: Ten Thousand Spirits that looked at Korean modern history through the checkered past and exorcism-based imagination of a shaman. Another Hong Sang-soo feature, Hill of Freedom, followed.

On television, she was designated as one of the co-hosts of a new talk show, Magic Eye; this was the first time Moon had been involved in variety programming.

Moon then made her directorial debut with the short film The Actress, in which she played the title character who goes mountain climbing with friends then meets up for drinks with a group of male acquaintances; once alcohol has loosened the tongues of her companions, she learns their prejudices against her. It premiered at the 19th Busan International Film Festival, where she also co-hosted the opening ceremony with Ken Watanabe. Along with two other short films The Running Actress and The Best Director, the feature-length film premiered in 2017. Moon has cited Lee Chang-dong as a key influence on her directorial work, saying that she thought about her experience with Lee a lot while making these three shorts.

In 2015, Moon became the first Korean actor invited as a jury member of the Locarno International Film Festival; festival artistic director Carlo Chatrian lauded her "brave choices (in selecting projects)" and called Moon "the jewel of the Korean movie industry". The following year, she was invited to the Venice International Film Festival, where she became the first South Korean actor to serve as a juror on the Orizzonti section.

In 2017, Moon featured as a political journalist in the election film The Mayor. 
In 2018, Moon starred in the Korean film adaptation of the Japanese manga series Little Forest, playing the main character (Kim Tae-ri)'s mom.

Among Moon's upcoming films are romance film Good Day by Zhang Lu, legal film Juror 8, and school bullying drama I Want to See Your Parents' Face, Moon also voiced The Underdog, which was directed by Leafie, A Hen into the Wild director.

In 2021, Moon appeared in the film Three Sisters, in which she earned two Best Actress awards at the prestigious 42nd Blue Dragon Film Awards and 41st Korean Association of Film Critics Awards, and a nomination at the 57th Baeksang Arts Awards category in the Best Actress – Film. In June 2021, Moon appeared in the MBC drama On the Verge of Insanity aired on MBC with Jung Jae-young and Lee Sang-yeob. Moon has confirmed that she will appear in the Netflix film Seoul Vibe with actor Yoo Ah-in, and Netflix drama Queen Maker with actress Kim Hee-ae, which are both expected to be released around 2022.

Personal life 
According to Moon, she had a strict upbringing; she was not allowed to go to the theater, and she was also forced to read classical literary works. During her childhood, she had to learn to perform pansori, and play the violin and the gayageum.

On December 24, 2006 Moon married Jang Joon-hwan, director of cult film Save the Green Planet!. Both Sungkyunkwan University alumni, the two reportedly met when Jang directed her in the 2003 music video for Jung Jae-il's 눈물꽃 ("Flower of Tears"). After suffering a miscarriage in 2010, Moon gave birth to a daughter on August 4, 2011.

Filmography

Film

As actress

As director and screenwriter

Television series

Television shows

Web shows

Theater

Awards and nominations 
The list below is sourced.

State honors

Notes

References

External links 

 
 
 

South Korean television actresses
South Korean film actresses
South Korean stage actresses
People from Busan
1974 births
Living people
Best Supporting Actress Asian Film Award winners
Marcello Mastroianni Award winners
20th-century South Korean actresses
21st-century South Korean actresses
South Korean women film directors
South Korean screenwriters
Recipients of the Order of Cultural Merit (Korea)